Julieta Szönyi Ghiga (née Julieta Szönyi, born 13 May 1949) is a Romanian theatre and film actress. She is best known for her roles as Otilia in Felix și Otilia (1972) and as Adnana in the Toate pînzele sus film series (1976).

Filmography
 Felix și Otilia (1972) - Otilia Mărculescu
 Toate pânzele sus (1976) - Adnana
 Iubire și onoare (2010) - Tanța Florescu

External links

1949 births
Romanian film actresses
Actors from Timișoara
Romanian people of Hungarian descent
Living people